The Journal of Applied Social Science is the official peer-reviewed academic journal of the Association for Applied and Clinical Sociology. It covers research in applied social science fields. It was established in 2007 and is published by SAGE Publications.  The editor-in-chief is Bruce K. Friesen (University of Tampa).

Abstracting and indexing
The journal is abstracted and indexed in Applied Social Sciences Index and Abstracts, Sociological Abstracts, and Scopus.

External links

Association for Applied and Clinical Sociology

SAGE Publishing academic journals
English-language journals
Sociology journals
Publications established in 2007
Biannual journals